Mount Burges is a town in the Goldfields-Esperance region of Western Australia.

References 

Goldfields-Esperance